Khvoresh Rostam District is in Khalkhal County, Ardabil province, Iran. At the 2006 census, its population was 14,577 in 3,765 households. The following census in 2011 counted 12,781 people in 3,808 households. At the latest census in 2016, the district had 13,839 inhabitants living in 4,455 households. The district is located east of the Qizil Üzan river, in the Alborz (Elburz) mountain range.

See also

References 

Khalkhal County

Districts of Ardabil Province

Populated places in Ardabil Province

Populated places in Khalkhal County

Settled areas of Elburz